Seedorf may refer to:

Seedorf, Berne, a municipality in the Canton of Berne (Seedorf BE)
Seedorf, Uri, a municipality in the Canton of Uri (Seedorf UR)